Puerta Real may refer to two places in Spain:

 Puerta Real (Granada), historic, central area of the city of Granada
 Puerta Real (Seville), an ancient gate of the city of Seville

See also
 Puerto Real, a seaport in Andalusia